Lucy Ferguson Reed is an American lawyer, scholar and practitioner focusing on international investment arbitration, public international law and international commercial arbitration. Lucy Reed is currently the director of the Centre for International Law. She is also the first Professor of Practice at NUS Law.

Education 
Reed earned her Juris Doctor from the University of Chicago Law School in 1977 and a B.A. from Brown University in 1974. She is a member of the New York bar.

References 

New York (state) lawyers
Academic staff of the National University of Singapore
Year of birth missing (living people)
Living people
Brown University alumni
University of Chicago Law School alumni
Presidents of the American Society of International Law